Apostates is a monotypic moth genus in the family Geometridae described by Warren in 1897. Its only species, Apostates solitaria, was first described by Hugo Theodor Christoph in 1887. It was found in Transcaspia, then an oblast of the Russian Empire.

References

Rhodostrophiini
Moths described in 1887